Aaron Stewart (5 October 1845 – 30 November 1910) was a British trade unionist.

Life 
Born in Coleorton in Leicestershire, Stewart's father died when he was two years old, and he began working underground in a coal mine, illegally, at the age of eight.  From the age of eighteen, he worked at various pits around England, before settling at Annesley Colliery in 1870.  The mine had a local trade union, a remnant of the Derbyshire and Nottinghamshire Miners' Association, and Stewart became active in it.

In 1880, Stewart was elected checkweighman at Annesley, and he was a leading figure in the establishment of a new Nottinghamshire Miners' Association (NMA).  He was elected as its secretary in 1884, serving part-time, but was unable to make progress in recruiting members, and stood aside in 1886.  Instead, in 1888, he was elected as the union's president, in which role, he campaigned for an eight-hour day.  In 1897, he was again elected as secretary of the union, and also sat on the executive of the Miners' Federation of Great Britain.

Stewart was seriously ill in 1910, and the NMA voted to reduce his salary as a result.  He instead resigned his post, but died soon after.

References

1845 births
1910 deaths
Trade unionists from Leicestershire
Trade unionists from Nottinghamshire
People from Coleorton
People from Annesley